Sardarabad (also Romanized as Sardārābād) is a village in Mirbag-e Shomali Rural District, in the Central District of Delfan County, Lorestan Province, Iran. At the 2006 census, its population was 100, in 21 families.

References 

Towns and villages in Delfan County